Eoran is fish roe such as mullet- or croaker-roe that is marinated in soy sauce while still in the ovary and half-dried in the sun. It is considered a delicacy in Korean cuisine.

Pictures

See also 
 Bottarga
 Karasumi

References 

Korean cuisine
Roe dishes